HMS LST-417 was a United States Navy  that was transferred to the Royal Navy during World War II. As with many of her class, the ship was never named. Instead, she was referred to by her hull designation.

Construction
LST-417 was laid down on 29 October 1942, under Maritime Commission (MARCOM) contract, MC hull 937, by the Bethlehem-Fairfield Shipyard, Baltimore, Maryland; launched 24 November 1942; then transferred to the United Kingdom and commissioned on 29 January 1943.

Service history 
LST-417 saw no active service in the United States Navy. She was decommissioned and returned to United States Navy custody on 31 May 1946, and struck from the Naval Vessel Register on 3 July 1946. On 4 December 1947, LST-417 was sold to James A. Hughes, New York City, and subsequently scrapped.

See also 
 List of United States Navy LSTs

Notes 

Citations

Bibliography 

Online resources

External links

 

Ships built in Baltimore
1942 ships
LST-1-class tank landing ships of the Royal Navy
World War II amphibious warfare vessels of the United Kingdom
S3-M2-K2 ships